Jonathan Moore (born 31 May 1984) is an English athlete who specialises in the triple jump and long jump events. Competing in the triple jump event in 2001, he won gold at the World Youth Championships and silver in European Junior Championships. A former holder of the British Junior long jump record, he is the son of Commonwealth Games triple jump medallist Aston Moore.

Athletics career
Born in Sutton Coldfield, Birmingham, Jonathan Moore began practising triple jump at the age of thirteen. His first medal came at the English Schools' event in 1999 and he won gold at the same event in 2000. In 2000 he also won the U17 Championships in both events and the Schools' International and Commonwealth Youth Games in the triple jump. That year he became the first under 17-year-old to clear 16 metres in the triple jump.

In 2001 Moore won the English Schools' title and AAA U20 gold in long jump.

This made him the first British Junior to jump over eight metres. He retained his AAA U20 title but in 2002, during the first event of the season, Moore ruptured his patella. He made a swift recovery after keyhole surgery and much appreciated support from fellow athlete Jonathan Edwards. In just twelve months Moore was competing again and he returned to further competitive successhe picked up a silver medal in 2004 for AAA Indoor Long Jumpbut disappointment was to follow.

He narrowly escaped a drug ban after testing positive for cannabis and was instead handed a public warning after he claimed that the drug had entered his system passively. He has been warned he faces a two-year suspension if he tests positive for cannabis again.

Family life
Moore is part of a successful sporting family: he is the son of 1975 European Junior champion and current athletics coach Aston Moore. He is the nephew of sprinter Wendy Hoyte (formerly Clarke), who is married to Les Hoyte, also a leading sprinter and sprint coach at Arsenal Football Club (brother of Trevor Hoyte, 1978 Commonwealth 200m finalist). His cousins include former Arsenal players Justin and Gavin Hoyte, and athlete Chris Clarke – the 2007 400 metres World Youth Champion.

Personal bests
Correct as of January 2009

All information taken from IAAF profile.

References

External links
Biography at Nuff-Respect
Interview published in the Birmingham Post

Living people
1984 births
Sportspeople from Sutton Coldfield
English male triple jumpers
British male triple jumpers
English male long jumpers
Doping cases in athletics
English sportspeople in doping cases
Black British sportsmen